Charles Montagu, 1st Earl of Halifax,  (16 April 1661 – 19 May 1715), was an English statesman and poet. He was the grandson of the 1st Earl of Manchester and was eventually ennobled himself, first as Baron Halifax in 1700 and later as Earl of Halifax in 1714. As one of the three members of the so-called Whig Junto, Montagu played a major role in English politics under the reigns of King William III and Queen Anne. He served as Chancellor of the Exchequer from 1694 to 1699 and as First Lord of the Treasury from 1714 until his death the following year. He was also president of the Royal Society and a patron of the scientist Isaac Newton.

Early life
Charles Montagu was born in Horton, Northamptonshire, to Elizabeth Irby and George Montagu, fifth son of the 1st Earl of Manchester. He was educated first in the country, and then at Westminster School, where he was chosen as a Queen's Scholar in 1677, and entered into close friendship with George Stepney.

In 1679 Montagu was admitted to Trinity College, Cambridge. At the time his relation, Dr. John Montagu, was Master of Trinity College and took him under his wing. While studying at Cambridge Montagu began a lasting association with Isaac Newton.
He graduated with an MA in 1682 and became a Fellow of Trinity in 1683.

Two portraits of Montagu by Godfrey Kneller are in the college collection.

In 1685, Montagu's verses on the death of King Charles II made such an impression on the Earl of Dorset that he was invited to town and introduced to other entertainments. In 1687, Montagu joined with Matthew Prior in The City Mouse and the Country Mouse, a burlesque of John Dryden's The Hind and the Panther. Shortly before the Glorious Revolution, he married his cousin's widow, the Dowager Countess of Manchester. In the 1689 election, with the support of the Earl of Dorset and the Lord Lieutenant of Essex, the Earl of Oxford, he successfully contested the Maldon constituency against the Tory Sir John Bramston. Montagu sat for Maldon in the Convention Parliament of 1689. He also purchased for £1,500 a position as Clerk of the Council, to which he was appointed on 21 February 1689. He was returned for Maldon again without a contest at the 1690 election.

Political office
In 1691, having become a member of the House of Commons, he argued in favour of a law to grant the assistance of counsel in trials for high treason. He became flustered in the middle of his speech, and upon recovering himself, observed "how reasonable it was to allow counsel to men called as criminals before a court of justice, when it appeared how much the presence of that assembly could disconcert one of their own body".

After the House of Commons he rose quickly, becoming one of the Commissioners of the Treasury and a member of the Privy Council. In 1694 he became Chancellor of the Exchequer, in reward for devising the establishment of the Bank of England, the plan which had been proposed by William Paterson three years before but not acted upon. After an unsuccessful attempt to supplant the Earl of Sunderland's leadership with the Whigs, he was compelled to reconcile with him in August 1695. With the support of Sunderland and the Court, Montagu was returned to Parliament for the Westminster constituency in October 1695. In the same year he was involved in the successful recoinage project. In 1698, having been appointed to the first Commission of the Treasury, he was also one of the regency in the King's absence. The next year he was made Auditor of the Exchequer, and the year after was created Baron Halifax, of Halifax in the County of Yorkshire, with remainder to his nephew George Montagu. His impeachment by the Commons failed, when the Articles were dismissed by the House of Lords.

John Macky relates a short description of the circumstances leading up to Charles, Lord Halifax's impeachment, in the Secret Service Papers published by his son in 1733.

...But as all courtiers, who rise too quick, as he did, are envied, so his great Favour with the King, and powerful Interest in the House, raised a great Party against him, which he strengthened, by seeming to despise them. The Deficiency of Parliamentary Funds, and the growing Debts of the Nation, by the great Interest of Paper Credit, laid him but too much open to these Attacks, he having the whole Administration of the Revenue. When he saw the Party growing too strong for him in the House of Commons, he prudently got himself made a Lord; and as a Screen from all Objections against his Administration, quitted his Management of Commissioner, to serve as Auditor: But his Enemies did not quit him so, they followed him into the House of Peers with an Impeachment, and so left no Stone unturned, to get him out of his Employ, bespattering him every Day with Pamphlets.
—Memoirs of the Secret Services of John Macky Esq., pp. 51–54.

On the accession of Queen Anne, Montagu was dismissed from the Council, and in the first Parliament of her reign was again attacked by the Commons, and again escaped by the protection of the Lords. In 1704 he wrote an answer to Bromley's speech against occasional conformity. He headed the inquiry into the danger of the Church. In 1706 he proposed and negotiated the Union with Scotland and when the Elector of Hanover received the Garter, after the Act had passed for securing the Protestant Succession, he was appointed to carry the ensigns of the Order to the Electoral Court. He sat as one of the judges of Henry Sacheverell, but voted for a mild sentence. Being now no longer in favour, he obtained a writ for summoning the Electoral Prince to Parliament as Duke of Cambridge.

Earl of Halifax

At the Queen's death Montagu was again appointed one of the regents. At the accession of George I, he was made Viscount Sunbury and Earl of Halifax, with remainder to heirs male, a Knight of the Garter, and First Lord of the Treasury, with a grant to his nephew of the reversion of the Auditorship of the Exchequer. Shortly afterwards he died of an inflammation of his lungs. The viscountcy and earldom became extinct on his death as he had no sons while he was succeeded in the barony according to the special remainder by his nephew George Montagu.

Halifax is reported to have left Catherine Barton, Newton's niece, a sizable inheritance for "her excellent conversation, as John Flamsteed wryly reported at the time. Many of his possessions were auctioned by Christopher Cock on 25 March 1740 at his room in the Great Piazza, Covent Garden.

Alexander Pope commemorated the Earl's death in his unpublished poem "Farewell to London in the Year 1715":

The love of arts lies cold and dead
In Halifax's urn,
And not one Muse of all he fed
Has yet the grace to mourn.

See also
 
 Whig Junto
 List of presidents of the Royal Society

Bibliography
Cooper, C. H. (1861). Memoirs of Cambridge. London: Macmillan.
Johnson, Samuel (2006). The Lives of the Most Eminent English Poets. Roger Lonsdale, editor. Oxford: Oxford University Press.
Thomson, A. T. (1871). The Wits and Beaux of Society. London: Routledge.
Handley, Stuart (2004). "Charles Montagu, Earl of Halifax." Oxford Dictionary of National Biography. Oxford: Oxford University Press online edn, Oct 2005.

References

External links

1661 births
1715 deaths
Chancellors of the Exchequer of England
Clerks of the Privy Council
Peers of England created by William III
English MPs 1689–1690
English MPs 1690–1695
English MPs 1695–1698
English MPs 1698–1700
Fellows of the Royal Society
Knights of the Garter
Lord High Treasurers
Lord-Lieutenants of Surrey
Members of the Privy Council of England
Charles Montagu, 1st Earl of Halifax
People educated at Westminster School, London
People from West Northamptonshire District
Presidents of the Royal Society
English male poets
Members of Parliament for Maldon
Earls of Halifax
Peers of Great Britain created by George I